The Bear Went Over the Mountain may refer to:

The Bear Went Over the Mountain (novel), by William Kotzwinkle
"The Bear Went Over the Mountain", a short story by Alice Munro
The Bear Went Over the Mountain: Soviet Combat Tactics in Afghanistan by Lester Grau
"The Bear Went Over the Mountain" (song), a traditional children's song